Sidney Charles Mullins  (born 28 October 1952) is a British businessman. He is the founder of Pimlico Plumbers, London's largest independent plumbing company, which he sold in 2021.

Early life
Mullins is the son of a factory worker father and his mother who worked as a cleaner. When he was born, they "lived in a couple of rooms in Camden", before moving to the Rockingham Estate in London's Elephant and Castle, where he grew up, and left school at 15 with no qualifications.

Career
Mullins was apprenticed to a local plumber at age 15. In 1979, he founded Pimlico Plumbers operating from a basement in Pimlico.

He is known for his collection of plumbing-themed number plates, used on the company's vehicles, and worth around £1.5 million.

In September 2021, Mullins sold a 90% shareholding of Pimlico Plumbers to US home services group Neighborly in a deal worth between £125 million and £145 million. At the point of sale, the business had revenues of $70 million and employed over 400 people. Mullins' son, Scott Mullins, remains Chief Executive with a 10% stake.

Politics
Pimlico Plumbers donated £22,735 to the Conservative Party in 2015, and Mullins donated more than £48,000, in the two years to July 2017. He was a business adviser to David Cameron and George Osborne, and has been a vocal critic of Brexit.

In January 2018, Mullins announced that he would no longer be a Conservative Party donor, and declared his candidacy as an independent at the 2021 London mayoral election (which had been scheduled for 2020, before being postponed) but Mullins did not appear on the ballot paper. In March 2018, Mullins said he would financially support the Liberal Democrats to support their campaign to prevent Brexit.

Personal life
He divorced his first wife, Lynda, to whom he had been married for 41 years. She is the mother of his four children, two of whom work for the company. He then married Julie Anne Morris, who also worked for Pimlico Plumbers. The couple later divorced.

Mullins was appointed Officer of the Order of the British Empire (OBE) in the 2015 New Year Honours, for services to the plumbing industry.

He owns a villa in Marbella, Spain.

Works
Bog-Standard Business: How I Took the Plunge and Became the Millionaire Plumber, 2015,288pp, John Blake Publishing Ltd.

References

External links

1952 births
Living people
British company founders
British plumbers
Conservative Party (UK) donors
Officers of the Order of the British Empire
People from Elephant and Castle